George Lukins, also known as the Yatton daemoniac, was a tailor infamous for his alleged demonic possession and the subsequent exorcism that occurred in 1788 when he was aged 44; his case occasioned great controversy in England.

Biography
The Rev. Joseph Easterbrook, the Anglican vicar of Temple Church, was summoned on Saturday, 31 May 1778, by Mrs. Sarah Barber, a woman who was travelling in the village of Yatton, Mendip, in the county of Somerset. The woman told the pastor that she came across a man by the name of George Lukins, a tailor and common carrier by profession, who had a strange malady "in which he sang and screamed in various sounds, some of which did not resemble a human voice; and declared, doctors could do him no service." Mrs. Barber, who formerly resided in Yatton, attested to the clergyman that Lukins had an extraordinary good character and attended services of worship, where he received the Church sacraments. However, for the past eighteen years, he had been subject to atypical fits, which Lukins believed resulted from a supernatural slap which knocked him down while he was acting in a Christmas pageant. Lukins was consequently taken under the care of Dr. Smith, an eminent surgeon of Wrington, among many other physicians, who in vain, tried to help George Lukins; moreover, after his twenty-week stay at St George's Hospital, the medical community there pronounced him incurable. Members of the community began to think that Lukins was bewitched and he himself declared that he was possessed by seven demons, who could only be driven out by seven clergymen. Rev. Joseph Easterbook contacted Methodist ministers in connexion with Rev. John Wesley who agreed to pray for George Lukins:  An account of the exorcism was published in the Bristol Gazette. The newspaper reported that George Lukins, during his alleged possession, claimed that he was the devil, made barking noises, sung an inverted Te Deum, and was very violent. In light of these claims, on Friday, 13 June 1778, seven clergymen, including Rev. Joseph Easterbrook, accompanied George Lukins to the vestry at Temple Church, where they performed an exorcism on the man, which included hymn singing and prayer. The deliverance concluded when the demons were allegedly cast out using the Trinitarian formula; the clergymen commanded the demons to return to hell and George Lukins then exclaimed "Blessed Jesus!", praised God, recited the Lord's prayer, and then thanked the Methodist and Anglican clergymen. Rev. Easterbrook, when recording the events under the patronage of Rev. John Wesley, stated that the account would be doubted in this modern era of skepticism, but pointed to "the scriptures, and other authentic history, of ancient as well as modern times" to buttress what he felt was a valid case of demonic possession. An article in The Gentleman's Magazine, and Historical Chronicle criticized the account, stating that Lukins actually suffered from "epilepsy and St. Vitus's dance." Dr. Feriar, a medical demonologist, criticized George Lukins as an impostor masquerading as a demoniac. Nevertheless, after the exorcism, George Lukins was described as calm and happy. Following this case, several pieces of literature were printed on George Lukins, thus popularising his alleged case of diabolical possession and deliverance, despite the original design to keep the case a secret.

See also
 Clara Germana Cele
 Anneliese Michel
 Robbie Mannheim
 Michael Taylor (Ossett)
 Johann Blumhardt

References

Further reading
A Narrative of the extraordinary case of George Lukins, of Yatton, Somersetshire: Who was possessed of evil spirits, for near eighteen years: also an account of his remarkable deliverance, in the vestry-room of Temple Church, in the city of Bristol. Extracted from the manuscripts of several persons who attended. To which is prefixed a letter from the Rev. W. R. W.. 4to. 23, [1] p. [Bristol, 1788] (W. R. W. = William Robert Wake)

External links
Wrington History: George Lukins - an account of his affliction and deliverance
Flickr: Image of Temple Church (Bristol) with account of George Lukins
The Changing Face of Bristol: Bristol Haunted Unusual Happenings
Duke University: John Wesley's Reading Evidence in the Book Collection at Wesley's House, London

18th-century English people
English Anglicans
Exorcised people
History of Methodism
People from Mendip District
People from Somerset
Spiritual warfare
Demonic possession